Berrick is a given name. Notable people with the name include:

 Berrick Barnes (born 1986), Australian rugby union footballer
 Berrick Saul (1924–2016), economic historian

See also
 Berrick Salome, village and civil parish in South Oxfordshire, England